Kri or KRI may refer to:

Ethnicity
 Kri people, an ethnic group of Laos

Languages
 Kri language, a Vietic language
 Krio language (ISO 639-3 ISO language code kri), spoken in Sierra Leone

Other uses
 Kurdistan Region of Iraq, an autonomous region in northern Iraq
 Kri (film), a 2018 Nepalese film
 Karikho Kri, politician from Arunachal Pradesh, India
 Indonesian Navy ship prefix KRI
 Key risk indicator, a measure used in management
 Koichi's Ruby Interpreter, for the programming language
 Kranji railway station, West Java, Indonesia (station code)
 Russian Game Developers Conference (KRI; ; КРИ)

See also

Kris (disambiguation)